An Tae-song (born 21 October 1993) is a North Korean international football player. He plays club football with April 25 of the DPR Korea Premier Football League.

Club career
During the 2019 AFC Cup, An made headlines for receiving the red card in the Final Match playing against Al Ahed FC.

References

External links 
 
 An-Tae-song at DPRKFootball

1993 births
Living people
North Korean footballers
North Korea international footballers
Association football goalkeepers
Footballers at the 2014 Asian Games
Asian Games medalists in football
Asian Games silver medalists for North Korea
Medalists at the 2014 Asian Games